Raven Records was an Australian record label that specialised in retrospectives and reissues or recordings by American, British and Australian artists.

Raven Records was established in 1979 by Glenn A. Baker, Kevin Mueller and Peter Shillito. 
It ceased operations in April 2017.

There is also an American label called Raven which specializes in organ music. It is not connected with the Australian label.

Musicians
Peter Allen
Doug Ashdown
Hoyt Axton
Daryl Braithwaite
Joe Camilleri
Joe Cocker
Donovan
Jose Feliciano
Four Tops
Bobbie Gentry
Lesley Gore
Richard Harris
Barry Humphries
Marc Hunter
Trish Murphy
Danny O'Keefe
Doug Parkinson
Sandy Posey
Gerry Rafferty
Normie Rowe & the Playboys
Helen Reddy
Johnny Rivers
Nancy Sinatra
Del Shannon
Joe South
Ronnie Spector
Willy DeVille
Kye Wilson
Steve Young
Stephen Stills

Bands
Anubis
The Animals
Badfinger
The Byrds
The Church
Crazy Horse
Divinyls
Dragon
Dr Hook
The Easybeats
Fairport Convention
The Impressions
INXS
Lime Spiders
The Loved Ones
The Masters Apprentices
The Missing Links
Max Merritt and the Meteors
Mink DeVille
The Rascals
Paul Revere & the Raiders
The Saints
Screaming Tribesmen
Bon Scott & Fraternity
Split Enz
Stories
Ike & Tina Turner
The Throb
The Twilights
The Yardbirds

See also 
 List of record labels

External links
 Official site

Australian record labels
Reissue record labels
Record labels based in Melbourne